Tower of Fantasy is a free-to-play, open world, action RPG developed by Hotta Studio, a subsidiary of Perfect World. The game is set in the far future on the extraterrestrial planet "Aida", contaminated with a mysterious but potent radioactive energy called Omnium after a cataclysm that nearly wiped out human civilization and mutated the ecology of the planet. The player plays a wanderer that explores the world and fights mutant creatures and hostile forces as they advance through the story.

Gameplay

Tower of Fantasy is a 3D "shared world" action role-playing game played with a 3rd-person view. The player controls a customizable character avatar who interacts with non-player characters and other entities and collects items as they travel around in the open virtual world. The player character can run, jump, sprint, climb, swim, and can equip various vehicles to move around in the world. The character's special movements with the exception of sprinting are limited by a regenerating stamina bar that slowly depletes as they continue in that movement mode. As the player character interacts with the world and the story, they earn experience points which increases their level and improves their combat stats.

The player fights enemies with various equippable weapons through a hack-and-slash combat system where the player character swaps between weapons to access their unique attacks and abilities. Up to 3 weapons can be equipped and can be switched at any time. Each weapon has a basic and a charged attack, and jumping into the air enables stamina-consuming aerial attacks and a plunging attack form. Ranged weapons have a basic auto-target attack mode and an aimed mode. Weapons also have a unique cooldown-based skill. As the player attacks enemies the inactive weapons build up charge and when fully switching weapons unleashes a powerful discharge attack. To evade enemy attacks the player can dodge in any direction, but are limited by a dodge stamina meter. Timing a dodge just before an enemy attack lands activates 'phantasia' mode that freezes time and all enemies within a certain radius for a few seconds as well as fully charges the player's alternate weapons, giving the player a window of time to deal massive damage while their enemies are immobilised.

There are different types of weapons and each weapon also has one of 3 roles (offense, defense, support) and various stats that affect how they work in the game. In addition to base damage values weapons have an elemental attack type (flame, ice, volt, physical), a shatter statistic that affect its effectiveness against shields, and a charge statistic that affects how quickly weapons charge up when using that weapon. An elemental attack can be activated by charging an attack and when used grant certain effects and debuffs against enemies. Equipping weapons with certain combinations of roles also creates Weapon Resonance that grants various buffs. Certain weapons, known as Simulacrum, possess an AI representation of their former wielders. In addition to having high upgrade potential Simulacrum can be activated to transform the player character into the Simulacrum character and gain access to their unique Traits. Upgrading these Simulacra also unlocks content that allows the player to learn about the characters within the Simulacra.

As a "shared world" RPG, players on the same server co-exist with and can encounter other players in the same instance of the game world. Tower of Fantasy supports co-op play where up to 4 players on the same server can team up to play together to explore the world, complete general or multiplayer-specific missions, or fight world bosses, and PvP where players can challenge each other to duels in open-world combat, or fight in an arena mode called Apex League to advance up a leaderboard to obtain special rewards.

Plot

In 2316 humanity discovered the habitable extraterrestrial planet Aida and, faced with dwindling resources and a collapsing environment on Earth, sent a colony spacecraft on a more than 200 year interstellar journey to establish a human colony on the planet. In 2653 the comet Mara is discovered and within it a vast reserve of a potent energy called Omnium. To capture the comet and harness this energy the Tower of Fantasy is built, but just 5 years after its completion an explosion of Omnium energy irradiates Aida and devastates human civilization on the planet. Some of humanity survives thanks to 'suppressors' developed to counteract the radiation, and the scientific organization Hykros is formed to enable humanity to adapt and further utilize Omnium. Opposed to Hykros is a shadowy organization that goes by the name of the Heirs of Aida, which views Omnium as a source of misery and evil and fights against Hykros to end Omnium research. Meanwhile life on the planet gradually mutates into increasingly aggressive and powerful lifeforms that pose a dangerous threat to the survivors.

About 50 years after the cataclysm the player and an unnamed companion are exploring a ruined facility on an unspecified mission when they are attacked by houndlike monsters. The player and the companion separate and the player survives the monsters, only for their suppressor to run out of energy and the player to fall unconscious. The player then wakes up in the Astra Shelter outpost in the presence of its leader Zeke and his sister Shirli, with no recollection of their past.

References

External links
Official website (Chinese)
Official website (international)

2022 video games
Action role-playing video games
Adventure games
Android (operating system) games
Dystopian video games
Free-to-play video games
Gacha games
IOS games
Multiplayer and single-player video games
Open-world video games
Space massively multiplayer online role-playing games
Unreal Engine games
Video games set in the 27th century
Windows games